George Graham Aitken (28 May 1925 – 22 January 2003) was a Scottish international footballer, who played for clubs including East Fife and Sunderland. Aitken was part of the East Fife's famous half back line of Philp, Finlay and Aitken.

He became the club's most capped Scotland player of all time, picking up five caps in 1949 and 1950. He always played for winning Scotland sides while with the Fifers. Aitken was among the players to have played for the club in their successful post war era when they enjoyed creditable league and cup success. Aitken won a further three caps after his transfer to Sunderland.

Following his retirement as a player, Aitken spent six years as a coach at Watford.

References

External links 

1925 births
2003 deaths
People from Lochgelly
Association football wing halves
Scottish footballers
Scotland international footballers
East Fife F.C. players
Third Lanark A.C. players
Sunderland A.F.C. players
Gateshead A.F.C. players
Scottish Football League players
English Football League players
Watford F.C. non-playing staff
Footballers from Fife